The following is a summary of Down county football team's 2014 season. This season marked the 20th anniversary of Down's last All-Ireland SFC win in 1994, which is also the year they last won the Ulster SFC.

Kits
McKenna Cup and National League Kits

Competitions

Dr McKenna Cup

The draw for the 2014 Dr McKenna Cup took place on 12 November 2013.

The final McKenna Cup tie for UUJ vs Cavan was cancelled due to UUJ withdrawing from the competition.

Fixtures

Table

15/01/14 Cavan vs UUJ – UUJ concede fixture due to inability to field team.

Results

National Football League Division 2

Fixtures

01/02/14 Down vs Monaghan – Postponed due to waterlogged pitch

Table

Results

Ulster Senior Football Championship

Fixtures
The draw for the 2014 Ulster Senior Football Championship took place on 3 October 2013.

Bracket

Results

All-Ireland Senior Football Championship

2014 saw the introduction of a new qualifiers set up with the fixtures being split into two sections A and B.

Down entered the All-Ireland series in Round 1B of the qualifiers. The draw for Round 1B took place on Monday 9 June and paired Down with Leitrim in Pairc Esler on Sunday 29 June at 2pm. Down were favourites to win and they hammered Leitrim 4-18 to 0-09 on the day to progress to Round 2B. The draw for Round 2B took place at 8:30am on Monday 30 June live on Morning Ireland, with Down being paired with Leinster side Kildare.

Down exited the 2014 All-Ireland series with a poor performance against Kildare, scoring only 3 points in the first half, only one of which was from open play. In the second half Down staged a comeback but eventually lost when Kildare hit 1-06 without reply.

Fixtures

Results

Notable events
 On Saturday 26 July, James McCartan Jnr stepped down as Down manager after five full seasons in charge.
 On Wednesday 8 August, former All Star goalkeeper Brendan McVeigh announced his retirement from inter-county football.
 On Saturday 19 September, Kilcoo manager Jim McCorry was named as the new Down boss on a three-year deal.

References

Down
Gaelic
Down county football team seasons